Bernardo de la Torre was a Spanish sailor, primarily noted for having explored parts of the Western Pacific Ocean south of Japan in the 16th century.

Bernardo de la Torre sailed under the instructions of Ruy López de Villalobos, who sent him in August 1543 on board of the San Juan de Letran (St. John of Lateran) to try to find a return route to the Mexican Western coast from the Philippines.

This was the fourth such failed attempt to find the route that would be known as the Manila galleon once it was finally established in 1565. De la Torre reached 30°N but then, like his predecessors, was forced back by storms.

In the course of his journey, De la Torre sighted for the first time some islets like modern-day Okinotorishima (which he named Parece Vela) and, possibly, Marcus Island along some of the Bonin Islands (which he called Islas del Arzobispo, "Archbishop Islands") including Chichijima (which he called Farfama) and the Volcano Islands subarchipelago (which he called Los Volcanes) which include the island of Iwo Jima.

His explorations, among others, were mentioned in Juan de Gaetano's chronicle of his own exploration, entitled Viaje a las Islas de Poniente ("Voyage to the Islands towards the West", 1546).

According to some sources, Bernardo de la Torre was the person who changed the name of what used to be known as Islas de Poniente ("Islands towards the West") to Felipinas or Philippines, to honour then Prince of Asturias and subsequent Spanish King Philip II of Spain. Other sources credit Villalobos instead.

De la Torre was the first European to circumnavigate Mindanao and, in general, added a great deal to European knowledge of the Islas de Poniente.

References

16th-century Spanish people
16th-century explorers
Colonial Mexico
Explorers of Asia
Spanish explorers of the Pacific